Leninsky Komsomol was a merchant ship of Black Sea Shipping Company (Soviet Union), a tweendecker type freighter with steam turbine engines and the first ship in the Leninsky Komsomol class, project 567. The ship is named in honor of the Komsomol league, which was added by Lenin.

Plenty of newspapers, magazine articles and short stories were written about this ship. This vessel was also mentioned in some books of various writers and in the memories of Soviet Union and United States witnesses.

Ship's data
Project 567 was developed at the Central Design Bureau Chernomorsudoproekt (CDB ChSP) in Nikolayev.
Major designers:
 Bohonevich K.I. (until 1956)
 Sidorov B.K. (1956–1961)

Steering gear
The rudder is typical, and hung on hinges. Steering is carried out via an electrohydraulic drive.

Anchor and mooring gears 
 Two bow anchors of Hall design and weighing 5 tons each.
 One stern anchor of Hall design on the starboard side of the stern and weighing 2 tons.
 One spare anchor Hall design and weighing 2 tons.
 Two windlasses on the forecastle for anchor and mooring operations.
 One capstain on the aft mooring station that was used for stern anchor and mooring operations.

Cargo holds, speed of cargo operations and cargo safety. 
 6 cargo holds and each hold has one tweendeck.
 Dimensions of hatches openings: four hatches 11.9 x 9 m; one 8.3 x 6.0 m; one 9.3 x 7.0 m.

Due to this tweendecker must be used in the tropics the holds dehumidification system was installed to avoid cargo damage due to moisture which is particularly high in the tropics. This system sucking outside air, dried air and sent by pipelines to the holds  using a few fans.

History

Ship's building.  Блог: морское право, страхование, арбитраж. > Судостроение Украины: прошлое и настоящее языком цифр и фактов.
Kherson Shipyard restoration had been completed on 12 December 1952. The tanker "Kherson" with deadweight of 11,800 tons was the first large-tonnage ship which was delivered to the customer on 2 December 1952.

Leftist revolutionaries headed by Fidel Castro and Raul Castro, Ernesto Che Guevara and Camilo Cienfuegos arrived to Cuba on the yacht "Granma" and landed in December, 1956. They started the armed struggle against the regime. To support Cuba The Soviet Union needed transatlantic big ships to support Cuba and able to work in tropical areas. Some shipbuilding specialists from Leningrad were replaced in Kherson.

During 1957 the main efforts of the entire staff of the shipyard was directed to the construction of the first in this class cargo ship with deadweight 16 000 mt? the bigger merchant ship in USSR. From the beginning the pre-production was delayed due to the backlog of the design work in the Nicholayev Central Design Buro "Chernomorsudoproekt", as well as extremely unsatisfactory receipt of rolled metal products. These circumstances made a very difficult situation for shipbuilders. A particularly large amount of work was to perform The chief technologist's department and technicians workshops had too much works: to develop a fundamentally new technology of ship's construction, create standard technological processes and schedules for preparation of production in a short time.

Technologists had made all the drawings separately for each workshop, drawn up statements of technological units and determined their laboriousness in early 1957. Still had to develop a standard technology and working technology on all kinds of hull works, installation of the main turbine gear unit, auxiliary machineries, shaft, main boilers, piping systems and to carry out finally works.

The komsomols and youth of Kherson Shipyard took patronage over the construction of the first cargo vessel in new class of ships and committed to pass this ship into operation to the 40th anniversary of Komsomol organization; that meant two months earlier than planned. Due to request of the komsomols and youth of Kherson Shipyard, the Ministry of the Merchant Fleet named this ship Leninsky Komsomol.

The construction of the head freighter begun in the metalworking shop in June 1957. Sectional assembly shop mastered the construction of large sections weighing up to 100 tons. Lack of experience and new technology increased difficulties for the collective. In addition, some problems were created due to the mistakes that were made in the manufacture of rigging, as well as poorly assembled beds used as support for big sections of the ship. Supply with the timber, specific thickness metal production were received with delay.

However, the innovators of the shipyard have made various proposals to improve the methods of ship's construction. For example, a group of engineers by name Eppel A.R., Kulikova A.A., Ziberova V.K., Bagnenko F.M. proposed to amend the scheme of pipeline for tank bottom heater. This greatly reduced the pipe's bending works. It is very time-consuming operation was a trimming of places for the installation of a set of sections, which was carried by a grinding machine manually. Workers of sectional assembly shop  Piller M.A. and Eremenko A.V. offered and produced a special pushcart with a load to which the grinding machine was attached. Now workers move the pushcart in places where the cleaning required and operate by switch which is mounted on the handle of the pushcart.

Works on assembling the aft part of the ship's hull and the stern frame installation required a great experience. To get the job done accurately and in time it always entrusted brigade of foreman Ivanov P.C. who came to shipbuilding in 1946 and began to build ships at the Leningrad shipyard. In 1951, he arrived with the accumulated experience at the Kherson shipyard in 1951 and was assigned to lead a team of fitters, which consisted of 17 people at the time of the cargo ship Leninsky Komsomol construction. Most of this 17 people were his students who later become experienced fitters. The assembly of the most complex parts of the ship's hull was assigned this particular team.

A change of leaders was at the Kherson shipyard in August 1958: the director of the shipyard IG Anatsky I.G. was transferred to work in the Kherson Economic Council, as well as former chief technology officer of the Black Sea Shipyard Zakharov A.N. was appointed the Kherson shipyard director. The new director has paid much attention to the construction of the head of general cargo vessel Leninsky Komsomol. The volume of work on the freighter has increased more than 2 times as compared with the tanker. Therefore, the director understood what an enormous effort will require the shipbuilding of this more complex vessels and the implementation of the production program as a whole.

To see photo: http://www.mycity.kherson.ua/gallery/displayimage.php?pid=2266

First voyages

Voyage to Japan.

Clipper in 20th century

In the middle of the 1960s and later the sailors of the Black Sea Shipping Company became verbally transmitted story:

 Turbine-runner "Leninsky Komsomol" overtake a foreign vessel and run ahead. The captain of a foreign ship increased speed and overtake the "Leninsky Komsomol". On Soviet freighter increased the speed also ... The captain of a foreign ship increased speed again and overtake our tweendecker. Then our turbo-runner increased speed up to Full Ahead, made circulation around the running foreign vessel, run far ahead and has not give a chance for the foreign vessel to overtake Soviet ship. The captain of the foreign ship call by VHF radio communication:
 - Whose ship? Which nationality?

It looks like a fictional story. But it is partly fictionally. Can be the circulation was not made only. To understand from where it had come we have to back in March 1962.

The cargo ship Leninsky Komsomol briefly returned to the port of Kherson in March 1962 and meeting of sailors and shipbuilders was carried out. The ship's captain Kud' I.A. spoke with admiration about the design of the ship, navigation instruments and equipment, about the fast speed of turbine-runner:
 We are entering the Red Sea and observe smoke of some steamers on the horizon. After some time we overtake and leave them behind our stern. 
 - Whose ship and from where? - British ship "Chitrol" asks using the Flag semaphore. 
 - From Kherson. - It is our answer. 
 - Where is this city, we do not know? 
 I had answered in details: 
 - "Kherson is a native brother of Odessa and they are living close one to another" - we sending by pass flags with humor. Well, everybody knows Odessa.
But the foreigner did not calm down and asked the company name that built the ship. The captain ordered to spell the Ministry. The Englishman again did not let up and wanted to know who the president of the company. The radio operator said the name of the director of the Kherson shipyard. Now the Englishman thanked and asked him to convey greetings to President of the company which is building such magnificent ships. And that will be very glad to see Mr. Zabotin personally (Zabotin became director of Kherson shipyard in 1961). This meeting took place then. Assertive English captain was the president of a major shipbuilding company. He was surprised with the Kherson shipyard. On departure he invited Mr. Zabotin to his guests. The invitation was accepted ...

This story was described in the magazine Ogonyok No.16 dated 15 of April, 1962, in which the author of the article "The flags remain astern" Mrs. Korobova R. wrote using own overdone manner:
 Approaching the Suez in January of this year the Soviet turbine-runner "Leninsky Komsomol" has overtaken the British passenger ship "Chitral". The ships passed one to another so close that you could see the surprised faces of the passengers on the "Chitral" using the binoculars. The captain of the British ship wanted to give up and he ordered to increase speed. Result was unsuccessfully and the British flag remained behind the stern of the Soviet vessel.
 "Leninsky Komsomol" is the young ship ... but for such a short time the liner has added fame to the Soviet sailors and shipbuilding in Motherland. Not so long time ago the captains of foreign ships were surprised that "Leninsky Komsomol" overtook a convoy after sailing from the Suez Canal. However, if it is considered an fortuity. But the second, third, fourth voyages - and again at the crossroads of marine Soviet ship meets with foreign ships. Again vessels under flags of different countries are being left behind ...

To see:    SS Chitral and sister ships.

Turbine-runner "Leninsky Komsomol" was able to increase speed up to 18.5 knot when the best cargo steamers in the Black Sea Shipping Company had a maximum speed not more than 14 knots and the old vessels had less speed. Only foreign warships and the latest model passenger ships could achieve equal or greater speeds. A 5 knot difference in speed is enough for circulation around another vessel that is underway.

Soviet fans and crewmembers of Leninsky Komsomol class ships call these ships "clippers of 20th century".

Voyage during Operation Anadyr and the break of Cuban blockade
The Minister of the USSR Merchant Marine Fleet Bakayev V.G. was summoned to the Kremlin to the Deputy Chairman of the USSR Council of Ministers Kosygin A.N. on 11 of June, 1962. Leonid Brezhnev and head of the Main Operations Directorate of the General Staff of the USSR Armed Forces, Colonel-General Ivanov S.P. were in the office already. Bakaev was informed that to be a major military operation for the transfer of personnel and equipment to Cuba, which would require the ocean going ships support. Thus began Operation Anadyr. This operation required the transportation of 230,000 tons of cargo and more than 43,000 people - representatives of all kinds and types of the USSR Armed Forces including the Strategic Missile Forces consisting troops of the strategic destination equipped with medium-range missiles R-12, R-14 with a range from 2,500 to 4,500 km (total 42 missile launchers) with nuclear warheads. All this had to be transported during the period from 15 July to 15 November 1962.

Voyage Feodosiya-Cuba
The ship Leninsky Komsomol sailed from Feodosiya on 28 of August, 1962. The destination port was announced Casablanca, (Morocco). The ship transported 3,000 tons of general cargo and air defense division.

Many years later, at the conference about Caribbean crisis, Robert McNamara, who in the 60s was the Minister of Defense, said that his office has even conducted an experiment. For some bulk carriers put Goo enough auantity of US marines were boarded the ships and this ships were replaces at the roadstead.

 "Those mariners stay on board one or two days and raised a riot. They had to back them concluding that like this situation can not be. And we have 18 to 20 days of sailing in such conditions", - says Soviet military Nikolay Goncharov later.

The former Soviet military commander Dmitry Yazov gave information:

 "Russian soldiers are hardy. Of course, it was hard and especially in case the 12-Bouthort gale. It was such terrible during the pitching and rolling. Many persons stopped to eat."

Dmitry Yazov - the future Marshal of the Soviet Union and the defense minister, and at that time was a Colonel appointed to command the 400th motorized infantry regiment hundredths, which was specially created to be sent to Cuba.

Those who used northern route were severely shaken by the storm. Soldiers, which coming to Cuba via the Black Sea, suffered for another reason. They still remember the voyage as a 20-day hell through after which they remain alive miraculously.

 "On the first night, approaching the Bosphorus international sanitary inspection checked the ship and we all closed and shut up. All stripped to his underpants due to heat. We thought that the inspectors would come now and will see us. No, nothing like that. A little launch moored alongside, they dropped the rope ladder was dropped for them and two large boxes were lowered by rope. Later we received information that caviar and cognac were inside the boxes", - said Nikolai Goncharov.

This bribe saved the ship from the inspection and the possible failure of the operation «Anadyr».

People slept on the multi-tiered benches.

 "We, 500 people, were placed in a compartment under the main deck. I slept on the benches there. Roasting was 50 degrees Celsius when moved from the Mediterranean to the Atlantic Ocean. If the coast was near or some ships were close all curtains had been closed and no one outside. When the red-hot iron leafs of hatches were finally shifted to open the hold pairs like in the bath began to fell in the direction from the hatch," - says Valentin Polkovnikov.

In addition to that bunks an infinitely long table was maden in the holds where they ate also.

 "We had the turn from the stern deck down by the ladder on the deck close to the forecastle. In the middle stood a man with a fire hose stood in the middle and damp you," - added Valentin Krasotkin.

 "There are two "holes" on the ship only for natural needs for 700 people. Once a queue. And while the two men did not come back from there, others are waiting for them here," - says Nikolai Goncharov.

If somebody needs to use the toilet urgently and at this moment to go out on the deck was not possible, then he lowered to the bottom of the hold.

 "There were buckets or bins, which then were pulled up by rope via our compartment and thrown overboard», - said Nikolai Goncharov.

Who had poor health the conditions of transportation have become a death sentence.

 "Somebody could not withstand and was buried in the sea and with a wreath as per sea custom. Like this our comrades were buried", - shared secret Dmitry Senko.

It was a little easier for those who went out to sea on board the ship in the late autumn when the heat was subsided. But even in the open ocean it was necessary to hide constantly. American planes appeared over the Soviet ships several times per day. Photos were taken by them and fell immediately to the analysts at the CIA.

Military equipments were installed on deck in a special containers. Their production was controlled by Alexei Kosygin personally. The top of containers were trimmed with boardsboards with inscriptions "Tractor-export" or "Agroexport" and un der cover the metal sheets to make it impossible to educate by X-ray.

 "We were able to determine that they are carrying weapons, but we could not say exactly what they are carrying in the holds. The Soviet people were very wise. They kept the rocket deep down, and when they unloaded them in Cuba, it was carried at night only", - shared the information the American expert Dino Brugioni.

 "We are more concerned about the fact that ships were high in the water indicating that they not loaded fully as per drafts", - says Dino Brugioni.

Perhaps if it will be possible to provoke the crew the Soviets reveal their intentions during the defense? It is why American planes whirled for days over slowly merchant ships that crossed the ocean to reach Cuba. With the ship's approach to Cuba the US Navy guard ships come close also.

 "Are flying all day. One goes away and another comes like jumping out from the water out and begins to swoop down and trying to go up over the ship or somewhere nearby. It was a powerful roar. It is happened at the Leninsky Komsomol. She is a powerful cargo ship on which were our guys. One sergeant told me that an American plane began to fly in the morning to nosedive over the ship. Once he flyed up over the ship again then he dives into the ocean" - says Nikolai Goncharov.

The plane just had not goes out of the last nosedive. The captain of the ship Leninsky Komsomol had requested Moscow and received permission to search and rescue of  the American pilot. The ship circled for a while at the crash site, but even on the surface the wreckage did not appear.

The ship Leninsky Komsomol arrived at Cuban port Nicaro on 12 of September, 1962.

 Privily. Personally. Reporting to Comrade Kozlov F.R.:
 On the approach to island Cuba the US planes fly over the Soviet ships regularly. There were registered 50 cases of flyby over the 15 Soviet ships in September of this year. The flybies were committed to an extremely dangerous heights. Leninsky Komsomol was under the flyby of unknown plane twice on approaching to the port Nicaro at 4.00 Moscow time on the 12 of September. The plane crashed into the sea 150 meters from the ship and sank after the last approach.

Starting from the 18 of September, 1962, US warships began to ask repeatedly about the nature of the Soviet transports cargo.

 The next voyage to Cuba was in the period of the embargo against Cuba in October 1962.
The ship came from Baltic. That was the transportation of subdivisions of 51 missile division to the Cuba.

Removal of the missiles from Cuba.  Central Intelligence Agency Memoramdum Supplement to The Crisis USSR/CUBA. Information as of 15:00 9 November 1962.
The Soviet Union was planning to complete the operation Anadyr until 15 of November, 1962, when all the planned parts, missiles, military equipment will be transported to Cuba. But in October USSR agreed with Americans to start removal due to Americans sussed about troops and missiles redeploy to Cuba. means covert operations Anadyr was broken and perhaps the Americans do not know the name of the operation. So secret operation Anadyr was broken. Perhaps Americans do not know the name of the operation and that gave rise the Soviet military to declare in the press that the operation was carried out successfully.

Newspaper "Utica Observer-Dispatch" dated 11 of November, 1962.
   The Navy was taking no chances that some of the Russian vessels might try to return to Cuba.
   The U.S. guided missile warship Dahlgren trailed a Soviet freighter through the windward passage yesterday to be sure there was no turnback.
   The Soviet ship was the 12,015-ton Leninsky Komsomol with eight canvas-shrouded long objects on its deck. These apparently were the missiles the Russian skipper exposed to a U.S. check Friday after holding out for six hours against inspection.
   When the destroyer Barry inspected the freighter Anosov at dawn yesterday the Soviet skipper refused repeated requests to completely uncover missiles lashed to the deck. But there seemed no doubt that they were rockets and the Pentagon said the count was carried, out "without incident".
   The guided missile warship took up the escort of the Leninsky Komsomol after the U.S. destroyer leader Norfolk had photographed the eight uncovered missiles on the Russian vessel's deck.
   The Norfolk had made radio contact Friday morning and went alongside the Leninsky Komsomol. It had the nose and tail sections of two missiles uncovered.
   An hour later the Norfolk asked that all missiles be uncovered and repeated the request soon after noon. The Sovietle skipper declined, saying he would have to radio his government to get authority to show missiles. But some six hours tater, the Soviet crew uncovered all the missiles.

Newspaper "Park City Daily News" dated Nov 11, 1962.
   Newsmen at the U.S. Guantanamo Naval Base in Cuba reported seeing the U.S. Navy guided-missile ship Dahlgren escort the 12.000-ton Soviet freighter Leninsky Komsomol through the Windward Passage.
   The reporters flew in a plane at an altitude of 150 feet over the vessels and could see deck crews at work. The newsmen saw on the deck, four to a side, canvas-shrouded long objects, presumably missiles. Lashed to the fore and aft decks were eight trucks.
   The Dahlgren was following about 900 feet behind.

To see photo:   The U.S. Navy guided missile ship Dahlgren trails the Soviet Leninsky Komsomol as the Russian vessel departed Casilda, Cuba, on November 10, 1962.

Brazzaville in 1963
Republic of the Congo independence was declared on 15 of August, 1960. President Fulbert Youlou became the first President and he was deposed on 15 of August 1963 as a result of inspired by Trade unions due to powerful protests against corruption in the administrative apparatus on the background of deteriorating economic conditions. Brazzaville became the capital of the independent Republic of the Congo in 1960. The one-party political system was taken as per low.

During two days, 15 and 16 of August 1963, the country was ruled by interim government whose leaders were David Moussaka and Felix Muzabakani. The power was taken by provisional government headed by Alphonse Massamba-Débat on 16 of August, 1963.

The ship Leninsky Komsomol brought weapons to Brazzaville in the period from March to October 1963 (exact date unknown). That time in Brazzaville port was tanker ship Krypton with captain Lewkowicz Vilior Vyacheskavovich. In own book "Аacetious voyage 1/13 or the first Fisherman's Day" in the article "Has you order the tanks accidentally or has not?" Lewkowicz writes:
 
In the evening, "Krypton" and the Panamanian cargo ship was pushed to the roadstead in the evening and the tanks were discharged from immense holds of "Leninsky Komsomol" at our berth overnight. Vasya disappeared and did not say "goodbye" ...

A military-man was on board of a ship with cargo weapons, but due to the great patriotic enthusiasm and pride for their country in those days the crew did not call the military-man as "arms dealer" that times. Today it looks like this.

To see photo: http://www.ebay.com/itm/SHIP-PHOTO-RUSSIAN-FREIGHTER-LENINSKY-KOMSOMOL-BUILT-1960-/361192959683?nma=true&si=W7i1md9zpiRY8l%252BdtQ0zhW1RkyA%253D&orig_cvip=true&rt=nc&_trksid=p2047675.l2557

The circumnavigation during 88 days in 1964.
In 1964 Leninsky Komsomol sailed from Novorossiysk to Japan with cargo 14,000 tonnes of iron. The ship passed Bosphorus, Dardanelles, Suez Canal, Red Sea, Bab-el-Mandeb and entered the Indian Ocean bound for Japan where the ship made the first stoppage in Nagoya. The next week stevedores unloaded the ship manually and the crew went out in small groups to the city. From the port of Nagoya Leninsky Komsomol run to Vladivostok for bunkering. After the ship in ballast crossed the Pacific Ocean and through Panama Canal reached Cuba. In the port of Cienfuegos ship was fully loaded with cane sugar which was shoveled by buldousers. After the ship was on the way at home, back to Black Sea, in Novorossiysk. Due to the bulkhead between the cargo hold No 4 and engine room was heated. The raw sugar turned into stone close to this bulkhead and it was possible to unload using the jackhammers only.

The circumnavigation took 88 days including 7 days for discharge in Nagoya, 3 days for bunkering in Vladivostok and 1 day in Cienfuegos. The ship passed 26,156 nautical miles (48,388 km). If we will discard the time of stoppages in the ports The Leninsky Komsomol was underway 77 days about - it was even less time then was allotted by Jules Verne (80 days). Can be it was a record time for the merchant ships for that time and eny way was the record for Soviet Union merchant ships.

1973 Arab–Israeli War
The Yom Kippur War, Ramadan War, or October War, also known as the 1973 Arab–Israeli War, was a war fought by the coalition of Arab states led by Egypt and Syria against Israel from October 6 to 25, 1973. The ship Leninsky Komsomol was one of eight Leninsky Komsomol class of cargo ships which carried out military cargo to Siria and Egypt in October and November, 1973. Also Soviet ships took part in this carriage. According to U.S. information the ship Leninsky Komsomol one time carried military cargo in Egypt: the ship passed Bosphorus on the 26 and arrived Alexandria on the 28 of October, 1973.

Other voyages
To see photo:  Soviet ship Leninsky Komsomol at Illichivsk ship's repair dock in 1966.

To see photo:   Soviet ship Leninsky Komsomol in 1980-s

References

See also

Cuban blokade
Cuban crisis
SS Metallurg Baykov
SS Metallurg Anosov

Leninsky Komsomol-class cargo ships
1959 ships
Cuba–Soviet Union relations
Cuban Missile Crisis
Ships built at Kherson Shipyard
Ships built in the Soviet Union